Deatonville is a rural unincorporated community in the western part of Amelia County in the U.S. state of Virginia. It is located along SR 616 (S. Genito Road) at its intersection with the eastern terminus of SR 617 (E. Sayler's Creek Road). Deatonville straddles the boundary between ZIP codes 23083 (Jetersville) and 23966 (Rice).

The community was once called Thompson's Tavern. A post office, originally with the spelling "Deatonsville", was established in 1813, one of the first in Amelia County; it remained in operation until the turn of the 20th century.

Sandy Creek Baptist Church, on Route 617, claims to be the oldest Baptist church in Amelia County, having been founded in 1771. The original building survived the Civil War but burned down in 1908. The current structure was dedicated in 1910 and has been expanded since.

Deatonville lies along the route followed by Confederate general Robert E. Lee and his army in their westward retreat during the final days of the Civil War, before the surrender to Ulysses S. Grant at Appomattox on April 9, 1865. Numerous roadside historical marker signs line the route, including one at Deatonville that reads as follows:

A historical plaque at Deatonville provides more extensive details.

Wootton House near Deatonville, built around 1850, is an I-house with Gothic Revival elements. The property, along with its associated structures, has been studied for possible listing on the National Register of Historic Places. Farmer House, several miles south of Deatonville, was added to the National Register of Historic Places in 1978.

References

Unincorporated communities in Virginia
Unincorporated communities in Amelia County, Virginia